Lidopus is a genus of jumping tree bugs in the family Miridae. There are at least two described species in Lidopus.

Species
These two species belong to the genus Lidopus:
 Lidopus heidemanni Gibson, 1917
 Lidopus schwarzi (McAtee and Malloch, 1924)

References

Further reading

 
 
 
 
 
 
 
 

Miridae
Cimicomorpha genera